Solid Modeling Solutions is a company who has an implementation of a mathematical representation of many NURBS (Non-uniform rational B-spline), 3D geometry, and Solid modeling technology which emerged in the 1980s and 1990s into a commercial implementation known as SMLib (for solid modeling library). This article will provide the background and history of this implementation into a commercial product line from Solid Modeling Solutions (SMS).  SMS is an independent supplier of source code for a powerful suite of 3D geometry kernels. SMS provides advanced NURBS-based geometry libraries, SMLib, TSNLib, GSNLib, NLib, SDLib, VSLib, and PolyMLib, that encompass extensive definition and manipulation of NURBS curves and surfaces with the latest fully functional non-manifold topology.

VSLib provides deformable modeling as part of a library using the constrained optimization techniques of the calculus of variations. The library supports several very different geometric operations.

PolyMLib is an object-oriented software toolkit that provides a set of objects and corresponding methods to repair, optimize, review and edit triangle mesh models. It can be used to analyze surface properties, such as smoothness and curvature distribution, as well as to repair and optimize surface meshes.

History
NURBS got started with seminal work at Boeing and SDRC (Structural Dynamics Research Corporation), a leading company in mechanical computer-aided engineering in the 1980s and '90's.  The history of NURBS at Boeing goes back to 1979 when Boeing began to staff up for the purpose of developing their own comprehensive CAD/CAM system, TIGER, to support the wide variety of applications needed by their various aircraft and aerospace engineering groups.  Three basic decisions were critical to establishing an environment conducive to developing NURBS.  The first was Boeing's need to develop their own in-house geometry capability.  Boeing had special, rather sophisticated, surface geometry needs, especially for wing design, that could not be found in any commercially available CAD/CAM system.  As a result, the TIGER Geometry Development Group was established in 1979 and has been strongly supported for many years.  The second decision critical to NURBS development was the removal of the constraint of upward geometrical compatibility with the two systems in use at Boeing at that time.  One of these systems had evolved as a result of the iterative process inherent to wing design.  The other was best suited for adding to the constraints imposed by manufacturing, such as cylindrical and planar regions. The third decision was simple but crucial and added the 'R' to 'NURBS'.  Circles were to be represented exactly: no cubic approximations would be allowed.

By late 1979 there were 5 or 6  well-educated mathematicians (PhD's from Stanford, Harvard, Washington and Minnesota) and some had many years of software experience, but none of them had any industrial, much less CAD, geometry experience.  Those were the days of the oversupply of math PhDs.  The task was to choose the representations for the 11 required curve forms, which included everything from lines and circles to Bézier and B-spline curves.

By early 1980, the staff were busy choosing curve representations and developing the geometry algorithms for TIGER.  One of the major tasks was curve/curve intersection. It was noticed very quickly that one could solve the general intersection problem if one could solve it for the Bézier/Bézier case, since everything could be represented in Bézier form at the lowest level.  It was soon realized that the geometry development task would be substantially simplified if  a way could be found to represent all of the curves using a single form.

With this motivation, the staff started down the road toward what became NURBS.  Consider: the design of a wing demands free-form, C2 continuous, cubic splines to satisfy the needs of aerodynamic analysis, yet the circle and cylinders of manufacturing require at least rational Bézier curves.  The properties of Bézier curves and uniform B-splines were well known, but the staff had to gain an understanding of non-uniform B-splines and rational Bézier curves and try to integrate the two. It was necessary to convert circles and other conics to rational Bézier curves for the curve/curve intersection.  At that time, none of the staff realized the importance of the work and  it was considered "too trivial" and "nothing new".  The transition from uniform to non-uniform B-splines was rather straight forward, since the mathematical foundation had been available in the literature for many years.  It just had not yet become a part of standard CAD/CAM applied mathematics.
Once there was a reasonably good understanding of rational Bézier and non-uniform splines, we still had to put them together.  Up to this point, the staff had not written or seen the form

 

for anything more than a conic Bézier segment.  Searching for a single form, the group worked together, learning about knots, multiple knots, and how nicely Bézier segments, especially the conics, could be imbedded into a B-spline curve with multiple knots.  Looking back, it seemed so simple: It is easy to verify that the equation for P(t) is valid for the B-spline basis functions as well as for Bernstein basis functions.  By the end of 1980, the staff knew we had a way to present all the required curve forms using a single representation, now known as the NURBS form.  But this new representation could easily have died at this point.  The staff were already 12 to 18 months down a development path.  They had completed a large number of algorithms using the old curve forms.  They now had to convince managers and the other technical groups, such as the database and graphics groups, that they should be allowed to start over using a single representation for all curves.  The NURBS surface form did not present a problem since they had not yet developed any surface algorithms.  A Review of this new TIGER curve form was held on 13th February, 1981.  The review was successful and the staff were allowed to start over using the new curve form.  It was at this time that the NURBS acronym was first used by the other side of the TIGER project, i.e., the TIGER software development groups of Boeing Computer Services.  Management was very eager to promote the use of these new curve and surface forms.  They had a limited understanding of mathematics, but they were very aware of the need to communicate geometric data between systems.  Hence, Boeing very quickly prepared to propose NURBS to the August '81 IGES meetings.

There are two reasons why NURBS were so quickly accepted by IGES.  The first was that IGES was in great need of a way to represent objects.  Up to that point there were, for example, only two surface definitions in IGES and the B-spline form was restricted to cubic splines.  The other, surprisingly important, reason for the rapid acceptance was that Boeing, not being a CAD system supplier, was not a threat to any of the major turnkey system vendors.  Evidently, IGES easily bogs down when different vendors support their own slightly different representations for the same objects.  At this first IGES meeting, it was discovered that the people with the best understanding of the presentation were the SDRC representatives.  Evidently, SDRC was also active in defining a single representation for standard CAD curves and was working on a similar definition.

So that's how NURBS started at Boeing.  Boehm's B-spline refinement paper from CAD '80 was of primary importance.  It enabled the staff to understand non-uniform splines and to appreciate the geometrical nature of the definition so as to use B-splines in solving engineering problems.  The first use of the geometrical nature of B-splines was in the curve/curve intersection.  The Bezier subdivision process was utilized, and a second use was our curve offset algorithm, which was based on a polygon offset process that was eventually communicated to and used by SDRC and explained by Tiller and Hanson in their offset paper of 1984.  The staff also developed an internal NURBS class taught to about 75 Boeing engineers.  The class covered Bezier curves, Bezier to B-spline and surfaces.  The first public presentation of our NURBS work was at a Seattle CASA/SME seminar in March of 1982.  The staff had progressed quite far by then.  They could take a rather simple NURBS surface definition of an aircraft and slice it with a plane surface to generate an interesting outline of some of the wing, body and engines. The staff were allowed great freedom in pursuing our ideas and Boeing correctly promoted NURBS, but the task of developing that technology into a useable form was too much for Boeing, which abandoned the TIGER task late in '84.

For the record, by late 1980, the TIGER Geometry Development Group consisted of Robert Blomgren, Richard Fuhr, George Graf, Peter Kochevar, Eugene Lee, Miriam Lucian and Richard Rice.  Robert Blomgren was "lead engineer".

Robert M. Blomgren subsequently formed Applied Geometry in 1984 to commercialize the technology, and Applied Geometry was subsequently purchased by Alias Systems Corporation/Silicon Graphics. Solid Modeling Solutions (SMS) was formed in early 1998 by Robert Blomgren and Jim Presti. In late 2001, Nlib was purchased from GeomWare, and the alliance with IntegrityWare was terminated in 2004. Enhancements and major new features are added twice-yearly.

SMS software is based on years of research and application of NURBS technology.  Les Piegl and Wayne Tiller (a partner of Solid Modeling Solutions) wrote the definitive "The NURBS Book" on non-uniform rational B-splines (NURBS) with aids to designing geometry for computer-aided environment applications. The fundamental mathematics is well defined in this book, and the most faithful manifestation in software is implemented in the SMS product line.

Philosophy 

SMS provides source code to customers in order to enhance and enable their understanding of the underlying technology, provide opportunities for collaboration, improve time to repair, and protect their investment. Product delivery, maintenance, and communication is provided by web-based mechanisms. SMS has established a unique model of technical organization and an adaptive open-source approach. The subscription-based pricing philosophy provides a stable base of technical expertise, and it is cost-effective for its customers when viewed from the perspective of total cost of ownership of complex software.

SMS architecture
SMLib - fully functional non-manifold topological structure and
solid modeling functionality.

TSNLib - analyze NURBS based trimmed surface representations.

GSNLib - based on NLib with curve/curve and surface/surface
intersection capabilities.

NLib - an advanced geometric modeling kernel based on NURBS
curves and surfaces.

VSLib - deformable modeling using the constrained optimization
techniques of the calculus of variations.

PolyMLib - an object-oriented software toolkit library that
provides a set of objects and corresponding methods
to repair, optimize, review and edit triangle mesh
models.

data translators - NURBS-based geometry translator libraries,
with interfaces for the SMLib, TSNLib, GSNLib,
NLib, and SDLib family of products, including
IGES, STEP, VDAFS, SAT, and OpenNURBS
capabilities.

Functionality 

Complete descriptions of the SMS product line can be found at the SMS Product Page

See also
Non-uniform rational B-spline (NURBS)
Solid modeling

References

Graphics software
Computer-aided design software